Sideliners (originally called Fever Pitch) is an Australian comedy sport panel chat show hosted by Nicole Livingstone and comedian Tegan Higginbotham which screens on the ABC. They are joined by a regular team of athletes and comedians including Amberley Lobo, comedian Dave Thornton and Paralympian Dylan Alcott. The first one-hour live show premiered on Friday, 30 June 2017 at 6pm.

See also

 List of Australian television series
 List of programs broadcast by ABC Television

References

Australian Broadcasting Corporation original programming
Australian comedy television series
Australian sports television series
2017 Australian television series debuts
English-language television shows